Chase the Clouds Away is the tenth album by jazz musician Chuck Mangione. The song "Chase the Clouds Away" was used at the 1976 Summer Olympics in Montreal, Quebec.

Track listing
All songs written by Chuck Mangione

Personnel
 Chuck Mangione - flugelhorn, electric piano, Fender Rhodes
 Gerry Niewood - flute, soprano saxophone, alto saxophone, alto flute
 Kathryn Moses - flute, piccolo
 Bill Reichenbach Jr. - trombone
 Edgar Lustgarten - cello
 Joe LaBarbera - drums
 Charles "Chip" Jackson - bass guitar
 Vincent DeRosa - French horn
 Esther Satterfield - vocals

Production
 Mick Guzauski - Engineer
 Dave Iveland - Assistant Engineer
 Harry Mittman - Photography
 Ellis Sorkin - Assistant Engineer
 Roland Young - Art Direction
 Kai Winding - Orchestra Contractor, Personal Manager

References

A&M Records albums
Chuck Mangione albums
1975 albums
Albums recorded at A&M Studios